On October 13, 2022, a spree shooting occurred in the Hedingham neighborhood of Raleigh, North Carolina, United States. Five people were killed, and two others were injured. The accused, a male juvenile named Austin Thompson, was detained after being cornered by police at a nearby residence and was in critical condition from a gunshot wound to the head sustained during the incident. Thompson survived his head injury and has begun to receive physical rehabilitation. He was transferred from a hospital to the medical unit of a juvenile correctional facility.

Shootings 
The shootings began in a residential area near the Neuse River Trail greenway area shortly after 5:00 p.m. on October 13, 2022. According to police, a gunman, armed with a shotgun, handgun, and hunting knife, first killed a relative at home, then went out into the street, where he fatally shot a woman on her porch and critically wounded another woman on the driveway of the same house. The gunman proceeded through Hedingham, shooting to death an off-duty police officer on the 6000 block of Osprey Drive. He then ran to the nearby Neuse River Trail, where he fatally shot a woman jogging and another woman walking her dog. 

Five people were killed, and two others were wounded. There were four separate crime scenes spanning . Police received the first 9-1-1 call about the shooting at 5:13. At 5:55, the Raleigh Police Department announced on Twitter that it was on the scene of an active shooter situation in the area. While the gunman was at large, local residents were advised by law enforcement to stay indoors at 6:49.

A police dog eventually tracked the accused to a wooded area with two barn-like buildings. When the police arrived at 6:45 p.m., the gunman fired multiple times at them, injuring an officer. Several officers returned fire, shooting an estimated 23 rounds at the building. After setting a perimeter around the structure, officers commanded the gunman to surrender his weapons and come out with his hands up. At 9:34 p.m., Selective Enforcement Unit officers breached the building and found Thompson inside. Thompson suffered a gunshot wound and was transported to WakeMed to be treated.

Accused 
The suspect was identified as 15-year-old Austin Thompson, who lived with his father and brother at Hedingham. He was a sophomore at Knightdale High School. The Wake County District Attorney announced that there were plans to charge Thompson as an adult. Immediately after the shooting, Thompson was reported as in a "grave" condition; he was moved to a rehab facility in November for additional treatment after being charged with the five killings on November 11.

Investigation 
Multiple law enforcement agencies, including the Raleigh Police Department and the ATF, are involved with the investigation. Governor Roy Cooper deployed state resources to assist investigators at the crime scenes. A "five-day report," including a detailed outline of the incident, was filed to the Raleigh city manager on October 20.

Reactions 
Two commemorative vigils were held in the Hedingham area on October 15. U.S. President Joe Biden said he and his wife Jill were grieving with the victims' families. Governor Roy Cooper said that the pain the victims' families were experiencing was unimaginable and that changes must be made to prevent similar tragedies. He later announced that flags would be flown at half-staff to honor the victims. Mayor Mary-Ann Baldwin said the residents of Raleigh needed to come together, adding, "We need to support those in our community who have suffered a terrible loss, a loss of a loved one." Additionally, several other senators and representatives spoke about the shooting.

See also 
 Gun violence in the United States

References 

2022 active shooter incidents in the United States
2022 in North Carolina
Shooting
Deaths by firearm in North Carolina
October 2022 crimes in the United States
Spree shootings in the United States